Cedric Nunn (born 1957) is a South African photographer best known for his photography depicting the country before and after the end of apartheid.

Career
Nunn was born into a mixed-race family in Nongoma, KwaZulu, in 1957. He was raised in Hluhluwe, Mangete and Baynesfield. He attended school in Ixopo KwaZulu-Natal up until standard eighth (Grade 10), when he was fifteen. He moved to Johannesburg in 1982 and began working as a professional photographer at the age of 25. Nunn became one of the prominent photographers to document apartheid resistance in the 1980s. He went on to co-found Afrapix, a photographic collective that supplied newspapers outside South Africa with images of apartheid, with Paul Weinberg, Peter Mackenzie and Omar Badsha. He served as the director for Market Photo Workshop, a photography school, gallery, and project space in Johannesburg, from 1998 to 2000. Nunn was also a member of the national executive of the Professional Photographers of South Africa (PPSA).

Nunn has worked for many nonprofits, newspapers, wire agencies, PR companies, and magazines.

He has taught at the Tisch School of the Arts at New York University, the University of the Witwatersrand Wits School of Arts, and The School for International Training.

Website: https://cedricnunn.co.za

Publications
In 2012, Nunn published the photography book Cedric Nunn: Call and Response. The book accompanied an exhibition of the same name that opened in Mozambique, New York, and various galleries in South Africa and Germany.

Awards
2011: First National Bank Joburg Art Fair Award.

Exhibitions

1983 Nichts Wird Uns Trennen (Germany) Group.
1984 Bosmont (Johannesburg, South Africa) Solo.
1984 Women at Work (Johannesburg, South Africa) Group.
1985 South Africa: The Cordoned Heart (USA & South Africa) Group.
1987 Stop the Killings (University of Durban Westville, South Africa) Solo.
1987 History Workshop. Wits University. Johannesburg. South Africa. Group.
1988 Children (Johannesburg, South Africa) Group.
1988. Ten Years of Staffrider (Market Photography Gallery, South Africa) Group.
1989 Beyond the Barricades (Market Photography Gallery, South Africa) Group.
1989 Culture for Another South Africa (Amsterdam, Holland) Group.
1989 Health (South Africa & Germany) Group.
1990 Zabalaza (London, United Kingdom) Group.
1994 This Land is Our Land (Bloemfontein, South Africa) Group.
1995 The Hidden Years (KwaMuhle Museum, Durban, South Africa) Solo.
1995 Black Looks, White Myths (1st Johannesburg Biennale, South Africa) Group.
1996 Colours (Berlin, Germany) Group.
1997. Malhawu, Macufe Arts Festival (Bloemfontein, South Africa) Solo.
1997 NGO Coalition (Johannesburg, South Africa) Group.
1997 Blood Relatives (Playhouse, Durban, South Africa) Solo.
1997 South African National Gallery Contemporary Collection (Cape Town, South Africa) Group.
1998 3rd Festival of African Photography (Bamako, Mali) Group.
1998 Democracy's Images, Bildmuseet (Umea, Sweden) Group.
1998 National Development Agency, Workers Library (Johannesburg, South Africa) Group.
1999 Democracies Images (Johannesburg Art Gallery) Group.
1999 Lines of Sight, The South African National Gallery (Cape Town. South Africa) Curated the exhibition "Photographs Denied"
1999 Workers, The Workers Library & Museum (Johannesburg, South Africa) Group.
2000 Every Child Is My Child, African Window Museum (Pretoria, South Africa) Group.
2000 Capitals, Espace Matisse (Lille, France) Group.
2000 Living In A Strange Land (Parliament, Cape Town) Group.
2000 Emotions and Relations (Sandton Civic Gallery) Group.
2002 Group Portraits, Nine South African Families, Tropen Museum (Amsterdam, Netherlands)
Bamako, Maison's Descartes. Amsterdam Photography Biennale (Amsterdam, Netherlands)
2002 Group Portraits, Nine South African Families (Tropen Museum, Amsterdam, Netherlands)
2004 Fatherhood Project (Johannesburg, South Africa)
2005 Blood Relatives (Constitution Hill, Johannesburg) Solo.
2007 Then and Now (Rhodes University, Durban Art Gallery) Group.
2009 In Camera (Wits University, Johannesburg) Solo.
2012 Rise and Fall of Apartheid, International Center for Photography (New York) Group.
2012 Cedric Nunn: Call and Response (International) Solo.
2013 Cedric Nunn, Call and Response (international) Solo
2014 US Museum Stellenbosch with Seippel Gallery, Unsettled
2014 Albany Museum, Fort Selwyn, Grahamstown, Unsettled
2015 Cedric Nunn: UNSETTLED  at UNISA Art Gallery, Pretora; Wits Art Museum, Johannesburg; KZNSA Gallery Durban; Galerie Seippel, Cologne, Germany; David Krut Projects, New York, NY, USA; Landesmuseum Hannover. Solo
2016 Cedric Nunn: UNSETTLED at Iwalewa-Haus Bayreuth, Germany. Solo

Photography essays
The following are photographic essay by Nunn. 
Blood Relatives – An essay begun in the early eighties documenting the struggle against apartheid 
Cuito Cuanavale – An essay on the site of a military battle in the late eighties that brought about profound change in South Africa's political landscape
Farm Workers – Documenting farm workers in South Africa's rural areas.
Hidden Years – A photo essay included in Nunn's first solo exhibition at the KwaMuhle Museum in Durban in 1996.  The photos were all taken in the Natal, Nunn's birthplace.
In Camera – Photos from post-Apartheid South Africa, created in collaboration with the Apartheid Archive Study project.
Jazz – An essay of Jazz musicians.
Johannesburg – Photos taken in 2000 during the height of transformation in Johannesburg.
Rural Development – Documenting rural life under democracy.
SANPAD – A series of portraits of young parents in South Africa (part of an academic study).
Struggle – Photos documenting South Africa's transition from apartheid to democracy
Then and Now – A project where eight South African photographers contribute photos from before and after the end of apartheid.

References 

1957 births
People from KwaZulu-Natal
Living people
South African photographers